Castle Hill is an electoral district of the Legislative Assembly in the Australian state of New South Wales. It is represented by Ray Williams of the Liberal Party.

It is an urban electorate in the Hills District in Sydney's north west, taking in the suburbs of Annangrove, Beaumont Hills, Box Hill, Glenhaven, Nelson and parts of Castle Hill, Dural, Kellyville, North Kellyville, Kenthurst, Maraylya, Middle Dural, Round Corner and Rouse Hill.

The electorate formed during the redistribution in 2004 and replaced the former electorate of The Hills, which was abolished at the same time. It was first contested at the 2007 election, when it was won by Michael Richardson, previously the member for The Hills.

While the Hills District has long been Liberal heartland, Castle Hill is considered a particularly safe seat even by Hills standards. Counting its time as The Hills, the Liberals have always won an outright majority in this seat on the first count. However, in recent years,  has run dead here; in the three elections since its creation, Labor has been lucky to win 30 percent of the two-party vote.

Members for Castle Hill

Election results

References

Castle Hill
2007 establishments in Australia
Castle Hill
The Hills Shire